Ignasi Giménez Renom (born 29 October 1979, Castellar del Vallès) is the mayor of Castellar del Vallès (Barcelona, Spain).

After having earning his PhD in law at the Universitat Autònoma of Barcelona, Renom worked as a journalist in Cadena Ser and in the City council of Badia del Vallès. Weeks after the murder of Ernest Lluch, Ignasi Giménez affiliated to the Socialists' Party of Catalonia and in the Spanish municipal elections of 2003 became a councillor of Castellar of Vallès by the socialist municipal group. At the end of October 2004 he became First Secretary of the socialist local association and in 2005 was chosen as a candidate to the mayorship in the municipal elections of 27 May 2007, with the support of the political platform Castellar en positiu. On 27 May 2007 the PSC-PM became the most voted political party in Castellar del Valles with 41.25% of popular vote and 10 councillors, one of whom was the former deputy José Eduardo González Navas. On 16 June 2007, Giménez became the sixth mayor of Castellar del Vallès (first mayor from a left-wing party) from the reinstauration of the democracy in Spain.

On 22 May 2011, with 50.14% of the popular vote, Giménez was reelected.

References

1979 births
Living people
Socialists' Party of Catalonia politicians
Mayors of places in Catalonia